Diosdado, Spanish name meaning "God given" and agnate with Theodore, is the name of:

Given name 
 Diosdado Macapagal (1910–1997), President of the Philippines from 1961–1965
 Diosdado Cabello (born 1963), Venezuelan politician
 Diosdado G. Alesna (born 1909), Philippine writer
 Diosdado Simón (1954–2002), Spanish researcher, biologist, botanist
 Diosdado Macapagal Arroyo (born 1974), son of Philippine President Gloria Macapagal-Arroyo

Surname 
 Ana Diosdado (1938–2015), Spanish-Argentinian writer and actress
 Enrique Diosdado (1910–1983), Spanish actor
  (born 1985), Spanish actor
 Nuria Diosdado (born 1990), Mexican Olympic synchronized swimmer